This page is a list of fishing topics.

0–9
1959 Escuminac Hurricane -
2004 Morecambe Bay cockling disaster

A
A Pobra do Caramiñal -
A River Somewhere -
Abalone -
ABU Garcia -
Age class structure -
Agriculture in Libya -
Agriculture, Fisheries and Conservation Department -
Agulhas Bank -
Akebono Maru -
Alaskan king crab fishing -
Alexander Neil McLean -
Algaculture -
Algal bloom -
Allan M.A. McLean -
Ama divers -
Amadou -
American Angler -
American Angler -
American lobster -
List of American fishers -
American Museum of Fly Fishing -
American plaice -
Amwell Magna Fishery -
Anchovy -
Ancient Hawaiian aquaculture -
Andrea Gail -
Androscoggin River -
Angling -
Angling in Yellowstone National Park -
Angling records in the UK -
Angling records of Europe -
Anguillidae -
Animas River -
Aquaculture -
Aquaculture engineering -
Aquaponics -
Aquatic ecosystem -
Arctic char -
Arctic Corsair -
Arctic grayling -
Argungu Fishing Festival -
Arizona Game and Fish Department -
Arkansas River -
Arlesey Bomb -
Artificial fly -
Asia-Pacific Fishery Commission (APFIC) -
Astacus astacus -
Atlantic cod -
Atlantic cod -
Atlantic herring -
Atlantic salmon -
Atlantic salmon -
Atlantic Spanish mackerel -
Atlantic surf clam -
Atlantic tarpon -
Atlantic white shrimp -
Austevoll -
Australian salmon

B
B. H. Fisher -
Bag limits -
Bait Act -
Bait fish -
Bamboo fly rod -
Bangladesh Marine Fisheries Academy -
Bank fishing -
Banks dory -
Basa fish -
Basnig -
Bass Anglers Sportsman Society -
Bass boat -
Bass Festival -
Bass fishing -
Bassmaster Classic -
Bay mud -
Bayou La Batre, Alabama -
Beach casting -
Bennett Spring State Park -
Benthic zone -
Benthos -
Bering Sea Arbitration -
Best Angler ESPY Award -
Bibliography of fly fishing -
Big Hole River -
Big-game fishing -
Billingsgate Fish Market -
Bioeconomics -
Bioluminescence -
Biomass (ecology) -
Bite alarm -
Blast fishing -
Blast fishing -
Blue cod -
Blue grenadier -
Blue mussel -
Bluefish -
Bobs Farm, New South Wales -
Boilie -
Bombarda -
Bonefish -
Bottom feeder -
Bottom fishing -
Bottom trawling -
Bowfishing -
Braided fishing line -
Brixham -
Broodstock -
Brook trout -
Brown trout -
Bruno Hofer -
Bureau of Fisheries and Aquatic Resources (Philippines) -
Busan Cooperative Fish Market -
Büsum -
By-catch

C
Cadgwith -
Callinectes sapidus –
Callum Roberts -
Calypso (ship) -
Canadian Senate Standing Committee on Fisheries and Oceans -
Cape D'Aguilar Marine Reserve -
Cape Islander -
Capelin -
Carp -
Cast net -
Casting (fishing) -
Catch and release -
Catch reporting -
Catfish -
Catskill Fly Fishing Center and Museum -
Central Marine Fisheries Research Institute -
Centre for Environment, Fisheries and Aquaculture Science -
Centre of Marine Resource Management -
Cetacean bycatch -
Chasse-marée -
Chatham Rise -
Chinese fishing nets -
Chris Yates (fisherman) -
Circle hook -
Clam -
Clam digging -
Clouser Deep Minnow -
Coarse fishing -
Cobia -
Coble -
Cockle (bivalve) -
Cod -
Cod liver oil -
Cod Wars -
Coho salmon -
Coleman National Fish Hatchery -
Commercial fishing -
Commercial fishing in Alaska -
Commercial trawler -
Common cockle -
Common Fisheries Policy -
Common periwinkle -
Common snook -
Conch -
Concholepas concholepas -
Connecticut River -
Continental shelf -
Continental shelf pump -
Coral reef -
Corf -
Cormorant fishing -
Couta -
Crab -
Crangon crangon -
Crappie -
Crayfish -
CSIRO Marine and Atmospheric Research -
Cul de canard -
Cullercoats -
Culture of Póvoa de Varzim -
Currach -
Cusk (fish) -
Cutthroat trout -
Cuttlefish -
Cuttyhunk -
Cyanide fishing

D
Daigo Fukuryū Maru -
Daniel Pauly -
Dar es Salaam Marine Reserve -
Dead zone (ecology) -
Deadsticking -
Department for Environment, Food and Rural Affairs -
Department of Agriculture, Fisheries and Forestry (Australia) -
DePuy Spring Creek -
Dexter National Fish Hatchery & Technology Center -
Dianna Clark -
Diawl bach -
Discards -
Dogger Bank -
Dolphin safe label -
Domstein -
Dongwon-ho 628 -
Dory -
Double-Heart of Stacked Stones -
Downrigger -
Dried and salted cod -
Dried shrimp -
Drift net -
Drifter (fishing boat) -
Dropline -
Dungeness crab -
Dworshak National Fish Hatchery

E
East Gallatin River -
Eastern oyster -
Ecology of the San Francisco Estuary low salinity zone -
EconMult -
Economy of the Falkland Islands -
EconSimp -
Ed Ricketts -
Edible crab -
Edward vom Hofe -
Eel -
Eel life history -
Egg sucking leech -
Electrofishing -
Environmental effects of fishing -
Estuary -
European anchovy -
European Fishery MLS -
European plaice -
Eutrophication -
Exclusive Economic Zone -
Eyemouth -
Eyemouth disaster

F
Factory ship -
Farley Boats -
Farm-Raised Catfish -
Fécamp -
Felucca -
Feskekôrka -
Fibras Industriales S.A. -
Field & Stream -
Fifie -
Firehole River -
Fish -
Fish (food) -
Fish aggregating device -
Fish and Game New Zealand -
Fish emulsion -
Fish farming -
Fish flake -
Fish hatchery -
Fish hook -
Fish hydrolysate -
Fish in Australia -
Fish market -
Fish meal -
Fish measurement -
Fish migration -
Fish oil -
Fish preservation -
Fish processing -
Fish processing facility -
Fish product sales -
Fish products -
Fish research institutions in the Maharashtra -
Fish sauce -
Fish stock -
Fish stocking -
Fish trap -
Fish wheel -
Fisheries and Oceans Canada -
Fisheries Centre -
Fisheries management -
Fisheries Research Services -
Fisheries Research Services Marine Laboratory -
Fisheries science -
Fisherman -
Fishermen's Union Trading Co. -
Fishery -
Fishery Resources Monitoring System -
Fishfinder -
Fishing -
Fishing bait -
Fishing by country -
Fishing communities in Maharashtra -
Fishing fleet -
Fishing in Alabama -
Fishing in Angola -
Fishing in Bangladesh -
Fishing in Chad -
Fishing in Chile -
Fishing in Ethiopia -
Fishing in Ghana -
Fishing in India -
Fishing in Ohio -
Fishing in the North Sea -
Fishing in Uganda -
Fishing in Wyoming -
Fishing industry -
Fishing industry in Canada -
Fishing industry in China -
Fishing industry in New Zealand -
Fishing industry in Russia -
Fishing industry in Scotland -
Fishing industry in the United States -
Fishing light attractor -
Fishing line -
Fishing lure -
Fishing net -
Fishing reel -
Fishing rod -
Fishing rod tapers -
Fishing sinker -
Fishing swivel -
Fishing tackle -
Fishing techniques -
Fishing tournament -
Fishing vessel -
Fishing weir -
Fishingkaki -
Flatfish -
Fleetwood -
Flemish Cap -
Flesh Fly (Fly-Fishing) -
Float (fishing) -
Florida stone crab -
Flosser -
Flounder -
Flounder boat -
Flounder tramping -
Fly fishing -
Fly lure -
Fly rod building -
Fly Tyer -
Fly tying -
Food and Agriculture Organization -
Food of the Tlingit -
Forage fish -
Fort Frances Canadian Bass Championship -
Frank Mundus -
Freshwater prawn farm -
Fulton Fish Market -
Fur-Fish-Game -
FV Cornelia Marie -
FV Northwestern -
FV Wizard

G
Gaff (fishing) -
Galápagos Marine Reserve -
Galway Hooker -
Game fish -
Garum -
Gathering seafood by hand -
Gazela -
Geoduck -
Georg Ossian Sars -
George F. Grant -
George Poveromo -
George Sleight -
Georges Bank -
Geothermal energy and aquaculture -
Ghost net -
Giant gourami -
Giant river prawn -
Gibbon River -
Gigging -
Gilleleje -
Gillnet -
Glass float -
Global Ocean Ecosystem Dynamics (GLOBEC) -
Golden North Salmon Derby -
Golden Triangle (Rocky Mountains) -
Golden trout -
Gotthilf Hempel -
Grand Banks -
Grayling (species) -
Gray's Sporting Journal -
Green abalone -
Green ormer -
Grey Nurse shark conservation -
Grieg Seafood -
Groundbait -
Groundfish -
Gulf States Marine Fisheries Commission -
Gunnison River -
Gyre

H
Haddock -
Haenyo -
Hair rig -
Halibut -
Halibut Treaty -
Haliotis corrugata -
Hand-line fishing -
Hand net -
Harald Rosenthal -
Hard clam -
Hare's Ear -
Harkers Island, North Carolina -
Harold Innis and the cod fishery -
Harpoon -
Hastings & St. Leonards Angling Association -
Hastings & St.Leonards Angling Association -
Hawaiian sling -
Hawkins Bank -
Herring -
Herring Buss -
Hickory Shad -
Hilsa -
Hip boot -
Hirudiculture -
History of fishing -
History of research ships -
Hol Chan Marine Reserve -
Homarus gammarus -
Hookset -
Hovden, Nordland -
Howard Marshall (broadcaster) -
Hucho taimen -
Hugh Falkus -
Humboldt Current -
Hunting and fishing in Alaska

I
Ice fishing -
Ike jime -
Illegal, unreported and unregulated fishing -
Incidental mortality -
Indian prawn -
Individual fishing quota -
Individual Transferable Quota -
Industries in Maldives -
Infectious Hypodermal and Hematopoietic Necrosis -
Inkfish -
Inland saline aquaculture -
Integrated Multi-Trophic Aquaculture -
International Collective in Support of Fishworkers -
International Commission for the Conservation of Atlantic Tunas -
International Council for the Exploration of the Sea -
International Game Fish Association -
International Land-Based Shark Fishing Association -
International Whaling Commission -
Intertidal ecology -
Iridescent shark -
Irish Conservation Box -
Isinglass

J
Jack Gartside -
Jackson National Fish Hatchery -
Jacksonville Kingfish Tournament -
Jagalchi Market -
Jangada -
Japanese butterfish -
Jason Holmer -
Jasus -
Jasus lalandii -
Jesús Vidaña -
Jig (fishing) -
Johan Hjort -
John Dietsch -
John Dietsch -
John Dory -
John Gierach -
John Wilson (angler)

K
Kaj Busch -
Kapenta -
Kayak fishing -
Kelong -
Kelp forest -
Kevin VanDam -
Killybegs -
King mackerel -
Kirk Lombard -
Kjell Inge Røkke -
Klinkhammer -
Kolae boat -
Kolis -
Krill -
Krill fishery

L
L'Acadien II -
Lampricide -
Lampuki netting -
Land-based shark fishing -
Largemouth bass -
Larry Larsen -
Leo Margolis -
Lerøy -
Les Anderson (fisher) -
Lightning whelk -
Lindy Legendary Fishing Tackle -
List of National Fish Hatcheries in the United States -
List of research vessels by country -
Little Cleo -
Littoral zone -
Live food fish trade -
Lobster -
Lobster fishing -
Lobster hook -
Lobster trap -
Longear sunfish -
Longline fishing -
Lophius -
Lossiemouth -
Lou de Palingboer -
Lowestoft -
Lugger -
Luke Clausen -
Luzzu

M
Macassan contact with Australia -
Macclesfield Bank -
Mackerel -
Mackinaw boat -
Madison River -
Mahimahi -
Maine Avenue Fish Market -
Maja squinado -
Mantis shrimp -
Maori cod -
Mariculture -
Marine and Fisheries Agency -
Marine conservation -
Marine conservation activism -
Marine debris -
Marine Fisheries Department -
Marine Harvest -
Marine Institute Ireland -
Marine pollution -
Marine Protected Area -
Marine reserve -
Marine snow -
Marine Stewardship Council -
Marlin -
Marlin fishing -
Maszoperia -
Matthew Hayes -
Maximum sustainable yield in fisheries -
Mazara del Vallo -
McKenzie River dory -
Merchant Shipping (Scottish Fishing Boats) Act 1920 -
Merlangius merlangus -
Mevagissey -
Michael Iaconelli -
Mick Brown (angler) -
Midwater trawling -
Migratory Fishery of Labrador -
Minister for Agriculture, Food and the Marine -
Ministry of Agriculture, Fisheries and Food (United Kingdom) -
Ministry of Agriculture, Forestry and Fisheries (Japan) -
Ministry of Agriculture, Nature and Food Quality (Netherlands) -
Ministry of Fisheries (New Zealand) -
Miramichi River -
Misgurnus anguillicaudatus -
Mogaveeras -
Monitoring control and surveillance -
Monterey clipper -
Mora National Fish Hatchery and Technology Center -
Moray Firth fishing disaster -
Mormyshka -
Mossom Creek Hatchery -
Muddler Minnow -
Multifilament fishing line -
Munster pilchard fishery 1570-1750 -
Mussel -
Mytilidae

N
Natchitoches National Fish Hatchery -
National Agronomy and Fishing Investigation Institute -
National Coalition for Marine Conservation -
National Fish Hatchery System -
National Fisheries Research & Development Institute -
Nazareth Bank -
Neritic zone -
Net casting -
New Zealand green-lipped mussel -
New Zealand sea urchin -
Newlyn -
Newlyn riots -
Nisshin Maru -
Nof Ginnosar -
Noodling -
Nordland (boat) -
North American Native Fishes Association -
North Atlantic Marine Mammal Commission -
North Pacific Longliners Association -
North Shields -
Northern pike -
Northern snakehead -
Northwest Atlantic Fisheries Organization -
Norway lobster -
Norwegian College of Fishery Science -
Norwegian Institute of Marine Research -
Norwegian Ministry of Fisheries and Coastal Affairs -
Noryangjin Fisheries Wholesale Market

O
O. Mustad & Son -
Ocean fisheries -
Ocean acidification -
Octopus -
Olympia oyster -
Open Hall-Red Cliffe, Newfoundland and Labrador -
Operation liberty (fishing) -
Optimum sustainable yield in fisheries -
Orange roughy -
Original Floater -
Orvis -
Ostrea angasi -
Outdoor Life -
Overfishing -
Oyster -
Oyster farming -
Oyster pirate

P
Pacific cod -
Pacific herring -
Pacific oyster -
Pacific saury -
Pacific Whiting Conservation Cooperative -
Pair trawling -
Palinurus elephas -
Pandalus borealis -
Panfish -
Papa Stour -
Paralithodes camtschaticus -
Paravane (water kite) -
Patagonian toothfish -
Paul Schwinghammer -
Payaos -
Peacock bass -
Pearl hunting -
Pectin novaezealandiae -
Pelagic Ecology of the Low Salinity San Francisco Estuary -
Pelagic zone -
Pelican (Fishing Vessel) -
Pelican, Alaska -
Pellet waggler -
Penaeus monodon -
Penns Creek -
Pentti Linkola -
Perhentian Islands -
Permit (fish) -
Perna perna -
Perna viridis -
Pheasant Tail Nymph -
Phil Bolger -
Phu Quy -
Pink salmon -
Piracema -
Pirogue -
Piscicide -
Pittenweem -
Placunidae -
Plastic bait -
Plastic worm -
Plebidonax deltoides -
Plug (fishing) -
Polespear -
Pollock -
Polperro -
Population dynamics -
Population dynamics of fisheries -
Portland, Maine -
Portunus pelagicus -
Portunus trituberculatus -
Power pro -
Priest (tool) -
Princes Street Market (Cork) -
Project AWARE -
Puget Sound environmental issues

Q
Quiver tip

R
R. J. McKay -
Raceway (aquaculture) -
Rainbow trout -
Rapala -
Reach cast -
Recreational fishing -
Recreational boat fishing -
Red abalone -
Red drum -
Red snapper (fish) -
Red tide -
Redbreast sunfish -
Redeye bass -
Redmire pool -
Reedville, Virginia -
Reef aquarium -
Reginald Beddington -
Research vessel -
Rex Hunt -
RIA1 -
Richard Walker (angler) -
Rick Clunn -
Rinovia Steam Fishing Company Ltd. -
Rio Grande -
Rock fishing -
Rock salmon -
Rough fish -
Royal fish -
Ruby River -
Rusnė -
Russian sturgeon

S
Sabiki -
Salmon -
Salt Water Sportsman -
San Juan River (Colorado River) -
Sand whiting -
Sandsinker -
Sardine -
Sardine run -
Sardinella tawilis -
Saya de Malha Bank -
Scallop -
Scallop dredge -
Scottish east coast fishery -
Scottish Fisheries Museum -
Scottish Fisheries Protection Agency -
Scrod -
Scylla paramamosain -
Scylla serrata -
Sea Around Us Project -
Sea cucumber -
Sea Fish Industry Authority -
Sea louse -
Sea Shepherd Conservation Society -
Sea urchin -
Seabed -
Seafood -
Seamount -
Seine fishing -
Shad -
Shanghai Fisheries University -
Shark Alliance -
Shark fin soup -
Shark liver oil -
Sheridan Anderson -
Sheringham -
Shetland bus -
Shifting baseline -
Shoal bass -
Shortfloating -
Shrimp -
Shrimp farm -
Shrimp marketing -
Shrimp paste -
Silver carp -
Sites of International Whaling Commission annual meetings -
Sixareen -
Skeet Reese -
Skipjack tuna -
Slender rainbow sardine -
Slurry ice -
Smack (ship) -
Smallmouth bass -
Smelts -
Snakeskin gourami -
Snapper -
Sockeye salmon -
Soft plastic -
Soft-shell clam -
Soft-shell crab -
Sole (fish) -
Solway Harvester -
Sørvágur -
Soudan Banks -
South East Atlantic Fisheries Organisation -
Southeast Asian Fisheries Development Center -
Southern rock lobster -
Spearfishing -
Speargun -
Spin fishing -
Spinnerbait -
Spiny lobster -
Spoon lure -
Spoonplug -
Sport Fishing and Boating Partnership Council -
Sports Afield -
Spotted bass -
Spotted seatrout -
Squat lobster -
Squid -
Squilla mantis -
ST Leukos -
St. Abbs -
St. Abbs and Eyemouth Voluntary Marine Reserve -
Stanley (boat) -
Stephen Bowen (biologist) -
Steven C. Hackett -
Steveston, British Columbia -
Stockfish -
Stotfield fishing disaster -
Streaked Spanish mackerel -
Striped bass -
Striped bass fishing -
Sturgeon -
Surf fishing -
Surface lure -
Surrounding net -
Sustainable yield in fisheries -
Swarm -
Sydney rock oyster

T
Tag and release -
Tailwater -
Tasmanian Seamounts Marine Reserve -
Taura syndrome -
Tenkara fishing -
Tench -
Tennessee Wildlife Resources Agency -
Tetraodontidae -
Texas Rig -
TFM (piscicide) -
The End of the Line: How Overfishing Is Changing the World and What We Eat -
The Field (magazine) -
The Golden Mile (Angling) -
The Sea of Galilee Boat -
The Terror (boat) -
Thomas Tod Stoddart -
Thresher shark -
Tilapia -
Tilapia in aquaculture -
Tilefish -
Tilting, Newfoundland and Labrador -
Topwater fishing lure -
Tore Schweder -
Tragedy of the commons -
Trawling -
Trident -
Troll (angling) -
Trolling tandem streamer fly -
Trotline -
Trout binning -
Trout bum -
Trout tickling -
Troutmasters -
Tullaghmurray Lass -
Tuna -
Turbot -
Turbot War -
Turtle excluder device

U
U.S. Regional Fishery Management Councils -
United States Fish Commission -
Unsustainable fishing methods -
Upwelling

V
Venus Bay, South Australia -
Vessel monitoring system -
Virtual Population Analysis

W
Waders (footwear) -
Wagenya -
Walleye -
Walther Herwig -
Welaka National Fish Hatchery -
Western rock lobster -
Whaler -
Whaling -
Whelk -
Whitby -
Whitby Seafoods Ltd -
White bass -
White spot syndrome -
White sturgeon -
Whitebait -
Whiteleg shrimp -
Wild fisheries -
Wolf Creek National Fish Hatchery -
Woolly Bugger -
Woolly Worm (imitation) -
Work in Fishing Convention 2007 -
World fish production -
World fisheries -
World Fishing Exhibition -
World Forum of Fish Harvesters and Fish Workers -
World Oceans Day -
WorldFish Center -
Worm charming

Y
Yabbying -
Yakima Klickitat Fisheries Project -
Yawl -
Yellowfin tuna -
Yellowhead disease -
Yellowstone cutthroat trout -
Yellowstone River -
Yellowtail snapper -
Yoal

Z
Zara Spook

 Index
Fishing